The Future Hndrxx Tour was a headlining concert tour by American rapper Future, in support of his  eponymous album (2017) and his sixth studio album HNDRXX (2017). The tour began in Milwaukee on July 8, 2017, and concluded in London on October 23, 2017.

Background
Following the Nobody Safe Tour, the rapper announced a second tour in 2017 that will take across North America, Europe, Africa and Oceania. Wizkid, Ty Dolla Sign, Post Malone, Zoey Dollaz, ASAP Ferg, YFN Lucci, Lil Yachty, and Rich the Kid were announced as opening acts of the tour.

Tour dates

Cancelled shows

Notes

References

2017 concert tours